Erwin Tischler (born 27 July 1951) is a German former cyclist. He competed in the individual road race and team time trial events for West Germany at the 1972 Summer Olympics.

References

External links
 

1951 births
Living people
German male cyclists
Olympic cyclists of West Germany
Cyclists at the 1972 Summer Olympics
Cyclists from Cologne